This is the list of cathedrals in Guatemala sorted by denomination.

Roman Catholic 
Cathedrals of the Roman Catholic Church in Guatemala:
 Catedral Nuestra Señora de Los Remedios y San Pablo Itzá in Flores
 Cathedral of Our Lady of the Conception in Escuintla
 Primatial Metropolitan Cathedral of St. James in Guatemala City
 Cathedral of Our Lady of the Immaculate Conception in Huehuetenango
 Catedral Inmaculada Concepción de María in Puerto Barrios
 Cathedral of Our Lady of Hope in Jalapa
 Cathedral of the Holy Spirit in Quetzaltenango
 Co-Cathedral of St. Michael the Archangel in Totonicapán
 Cathedral of the Holy Cross in Santa Cruz del Quiché
 Cathedral of St. Mark in San Marcos
 Catedral del Niño Dios de Cuilapa in Santa Rosa de Lima
 Basílica del Cristo Negro de Esquipulas in Esquipulas
 Cathedral of Our Lady of the Assumption in Sololá Department
 Co-Cathedral of St. Ann in Chimaltenango
 Cathedral of St. Bartholomew in Suchitepéquez Department
 Cathedral of St. Dominic in Cobán
 Cathedral of St. Peter in Zacapa

Anglican
Cathedrals of the Anglican Church in Central America:
 Cathedral of St James the Apostle in Guatemala City

See also
Lists of cathedrals

References

External links

Cathedrals
Guatemala
Cathedrals